Tyuryushevo (Türeş) is a rural locality (a selo) and the administrative centre of Tyuryushevsky Selsoviet, Buzdyaksky District, Bashkortostan, Russia. The population was 722 as of 2010. There are 4 streets.

Geography 
Tyuryushevo is located 40 km north of Buzdyak (the district's administrative centre) by road. Kuzeyevo is the nearest rural locality.

References 

Rural localities in Buzdyaksky District
Ufa Governorate